WEC 13: Heavyweight Explosion was a mixed martial arts event promoted by World Extreme Cagefighting on January 22, 2005 at the Tachi Palace Hotel & Casino in Lemoore, California. The card featured a 4-man Heavyweight Tournament featuring Brandon Vera as well as single fights which saw the likes of Jason "The Punisher" Lambert, Brad Imes, and MMA legend "Mr. International" Shonie Carter compete.

Results

Bracket

See also 
 World Extreme Cagefighting
 List of World Extreme Cagefighting champions
 List of WEC events
 2005 in WEC

External links
 WEC 13 Results at Sherdog.com

World Extreme Cagefighting events
2005 in mixed martial arts
Mixed martial arts in California
Sports in Lemoore, California
2005 in sports in California